The 2022–23 season is St Mirren's 5th consecutive season in the top tier of Scottish football since being promoted from the Scottish Championship at the end of the 2017–18 season. The club will also participate in the League Cup and Scottish Cup.

Season summary
 17 May - the following players left the club at the end of the season: Alan Power (moved to Kilmarnock), Kyle McAllister (released), Matt Millar (released), Josh Jack (released), Conor McCarthy (rejected new contract), Jak Alnwick (moved to Cardiff City), Connor Ronan (end of loan) and Jordan Jones (end of loan).

Also on this day, midfielder Ryan Flynn signed a one-year contract extension, keeping him at the club until the summer of 2023.

 20 May - midfielder Mark O'Hara signed from Motherwell on a two-year deal.
 25 May - goalkeeper Trevor Carson signed from Dundee United on a two-year deal.

On this day St Mirren were drawn to play Arbroath, Airdrieonians, Edinburgh City and Cowdenbeath in Group E of the Scottish League Cup.

 1 June - The club announced the signing of Kenyan winger Jonah Ayunga, who joined on a two-year deal and would be reunited with manager Stephen Robinson from his time at Morecambe.

 8 June - defender Daniel Finlayson joined Linfield on a season long loan deal.

 17 June - English forward Toyosi Olusanya signed for Saints on a two-year deal after leaving Middlesbrough.

 21 June - Australian defender Ryan Strain signed for the club on a two-year deal after leaving Israeli side Maccabi Haifa.

 26 June - Scottish international defender Declan Gallagher signed a two-year deal with Saints after his contract with Aberdeen was terminated.

 27 June - midfielder Keanu Baccus signed a two-year deal from Australian club Western Sydney Wanderers

 1 July - youth midfielder Dean McMaster joined Airdrieonians on loan.

Competitions

Results and fixtures

Pre-season and friendlies

Scottish Premiership

Scottish League Cup

Group stage

Scottish Cup

Player statistics

Appearances and goals

|-
|colspan="12"|Players who left the club during the 2022–23 season
|-

|}

Goal scorers

Disciplinary record
Includes all competitive matches.
Last updated 18 March 2023

Team statistics

League table

Division summary

League Cup table

Transfers

Players in

Players out

References

St Mirren F.C. seasons
St Mirren